Estrela-Guia is a Brazilian telenovela produced and broadcast by TV Globo. It premiered on 12 March 2001, replacing O Cravo e a Rosa, and ended on 15 June 2001, replaced by A Padroeira. The telenovela is written by Ana Maria Moretzsohn, with the collaboration of Daisy Chaves, Izabel de Oliveira, Fernando Rebello, and Patrícia Moretzsohn.

The telenovela includes the themes of the hippie world, astrology, esotericism and urban life. Estrela-Guia tells the story of Cristal, whose astrological cards show that her destiny is linked to that of Tony, her godfather.

It stars Sandy, Guilherme Fontes, Carolina Ferraz, Rodrigo Santoro, Thaís Fersoza, Rosamaria Murtinho, Lucinha Lins, and Lilia Cabral.

Plot 
In the 1980s, hippie Bob (Marcos Winter) leaves his life in Rio de Janeiro to marry Catherine (Maitê Proença), an American he met during a trip to California. They establish the alternative community, Arco da Aliança, in the interior of Goiás and adopt the names of Hanuman and Kalinda. They have a daughter, Cristal (Sandy), whose godfather is workaholic Tony (Guilherme Fontes), Bob's former co-worker. Years later, Cristal is something of a leader in Arco da Aliança, but has to deal with the unexpected death of her parents in a mysterious fire. As a minor, she must move in to her godfather's house in Rio de Janeiro. In addition to the difficulties of adjusting to the city, Cristal finds herself in love with her godfather, who struggles with his feelings for his goddaughter as immoral.

Cast 
 Sandy as Cristal Hanumam 
 Guilherme Fontes as Luís Antônio "Tony" Salles 
 Carolina Ferraz as Vanessa Rios
 Rodrigo Santoro as Carlos Charles Pimenta 
 Thaís Fersoza as Gisela Rios
 Rosamaria Murtinho as Carlota Salles
 Lucinha Lins as Lucrécia Espíndola
 Lília Cabral as Daphne "Daf" Pimenta
 Sérgio Mamberti as Alaor Pimenta 
 Floriano Peixoto as Inácio
 Thiago Fragoso as Bernardo Lima
 Sergio Marone as Santiago / Fernando Ribeiro
 Fernanda Rodrigues as Sukhi Sukham
 Junior Lima as José Carlos "Zeca" Oliveira
 Christine Fernandes as Lara Gouveia "Lalá"
 Gabriel Braga Nunes as Guilherme Nunes
 Nelson Xavier as Purunam Sukham
 Mônica Torres as Su-Sukham
 Tarcísio Filho as Mauro Lima
 Graziella Moretto as Heloísa Castro Lima
 Isabela Garcia as Luciana Teixeira
 Evandro Mesquita as André Teixeira
 Nizo Neto as Elesbão Cruz
 Ana Carbatti as Dominique Cruz
 Maurício Gonçalves as Michael Brooks
 Irving São Paulo as Humberto
 Oberdan Júnior as Rafael Curi
 Marcelo Freitas as Diogo
 Alexandre Barbalho as Felício
 Maria Pompeu as Nenzinha
 Cida Moreyra as Castorina dos Santos
 Flávia Bonato as Maria Aparecida "Cida" Barreto
 Miguel Magno as Romeu
 Jorge Botelho as Rogê
 Lucy Mafra as Tânia
 Thiago de Los Reyes as João Lima
 Natália Barreto as Priscila Lima
 Renata Bravin as Maria Teixeira
 Netinho Alves as Daniel Salles

Guest stars 
 Maitê Proença as Catherine McAdams / Kalinda Hanumam
 Marcos Winter as Paulo Roberto "Bob" Macedo / Orvale Hanumam
 Cláudia Ohana as Glorinha
 Marcos Pasquim as Edmilson
 Daniele Suzuki as Bianca
 Ana Beatriz Nogueira as Esperança
 Narcisa Tamborindeguy as Herself

Production 
In 2000, TV Globo decided to try a telenovela for a younger audience in the 6 p.m. timeslot, which until then had been occupied by period dramas or contemporary dramas of a more serious nature, the reason being to retain the young viewers that stopped watching the network after the end of Malhação, a teen soap opera that aired before the 6 p.m. telenovela. At the time, Walcyr Carrasco was already writing the next telenovela for the timeslot, A Padroeira, which would debut in June 2001, with Ana Maria Moretzsohn having to write a plot of only three months, not having the option of extending the telenovela, both because of Sandy's busy schedule in music, and the ongoing production of the next telenovela. Due to the good reception with the audience, other telenovelas aimed at a young audience were later produced, such as Coração de Estudante and Agora É que São Elas.

According to Ana Maria Moretzsohn, the telenovela was written specifically for Sandy to play the lead role, since she wanted the singer to present a different image than the comedic one she portrayed in the  Sandy & Junior television series. To bring the character Cristal to life, Sandy learned to chant mantras and also had to slow down the rhythm of her speech and breathing.

Reception

Ratings

Soundtrack 

Estrela-Guia is the soundtrack of the telenovela, released in 2001 by Som Livre.

References

External links 
 

2001 Brazilian television series debuts
2001 Brazilian television series endings
2001 telenovelas
2000s Brazilian television series
TV Globo telenovelas
Brazilian telenovelas
Portuguese-language telenovelas